Malta is for non-local government purposes divided into districts as opposed to the local government localities. The three main types of such districts – statistical, electoral at national level, and policing – have no mainstream administrative effect as the local councils form the first-tier – moreover only administrative tier – divisions of the country.

Statistical districts and regions
Six districts exist, used for statistical purposes and which are, in turn, grouped into three regions: Gozo, Malta Majjistral and Malta Xlokk. Each district consists of several localities. The Northern Harbour District, Western District and Northern District together form the North Western Region (Malta Majjistral). The South Eastern District and Southern Harbour District form the South Eastern Region (Malta Xlokk). The Gozo and Comino District is a Region in its own right.

Southern Harbour District

The Southern Harbour District forms part of Malta Xlokk. It contains 14 local councils including the all but western suburbs of the capital Valletta and the small cities Birgu, Cospicua, Senglea and Żabbar. Its largest locality is Żabbar; its smallest, Xgħajra. The District's population is 80,170 (as of 31 December 2016) across its 26.1 km2. Thus it then ranked second-most populous and had the fifth-largest extent.
Birgu (Vittoriosa) 2,451 population (at end 2016)
Bormla (Cospicua) 5,147
Fgura 11,714
Floriana (Furjana) 1,966
Senglea (Isla) 2,691
Kalkara 3,006
Luqa, include the hamlet of Ħal Farruġ 5,793
Marsa (both parishes; the Parish of the Holy Trinity and the Parish of Maria Regina) 5,328
Paola (Paola) (both parishes; the Parish of Christ the King and the Parish of Our Lady of Lourdes) 8,241
Santa Luċija 2,929
Tarxien 8,674
Valletta (the four parishes; the Parish of Our Lady of Porto Salvo, the Parish of Our Lady of Mount Carmel, the Parish of St. Paul's Shipwreck and the Parish of St. Augustine) 5,656
Xgħajra 1,673
Żabbar, include the hamlet of St. Peter's 14,901

Northern Harbour District

The Northern Harbour District forms part of the Central Region. It contains 13 local councils including the city of Qormi, with the largest locality being Birkirkara ( 22,314). The smallest one is Ta' Xbiex (pop. 1,657). The population of the District is 131,056 (as of 31 December 2016) across its 24.1 km2. It is the most populous and yet the smallest.
Birkirkara (include the hamlets of Fleur-de-Lys (Parish of Our Lady of Mount Carmel) and Is-Swatar (Parish of St. George Preca) and the Parish of St. Helen, the Parish of St. Joseph the Worker and the Parish of St. Mary)
Il-Gżira
Il-Ħamrun (both parishes; the Parish of St. Gaetano and the Parish of the Immaculate Conception) 
L-Imsida 
Pembroke
Tal-Pietà (include the hamlet of Guardamangia)
Ħal Qormi (both parishes; the Parish of St. George and the Parish of St. Sebastian) 
San Ġiljan (include the hamlet of Paceville and the parish area of Balluta Bay) 
San Ġwann (include the hamlet of Il-Kappara)
Santa Venera 
Tas-Sliema (the four parishes; the Parish of Stella Maris, the Parish of Sacro Cour, the Parish of St. Gregory and the Parish of Jesus of Nazareth) 
Is-Swieqi (include the hamlet of Madliena) 
Ta' Xbiex

South Eastern District

The South Eastern District forms part of Malta Xlokk. It contains 11 local councils including the city of Żejtun, with the largest locality being Marsaskala ( 12,281) while the smallest one is Ħal Safi (pop. 2,168). The population of the District is 68,044 (as of 31 December 2016) across its 54.3 km2. It is the fourth-largest district by population and area.
Birżebbuġa
Ħal Għaxaq
Il-Gudja
Ħal Kirkop
Marsaskala (Wied il-Għajn)
Marsaxlokk
L-Imqabba
Il-Qrendi
Ħal Safi
Iż-Żejtun 
Iż-Żurrieq (include the hamlet of Bubaqra)

Western District

The Western District forms part of Malta Majjistral. It contains 10 local councils including the cities of Mdina, Siġġiewi and Żebbuġ, the most populous locality being Żebbuġ ( 11,759). The smallest one is Mdina (pop. 229). The population of the District is 59,817 (as of 31 December 2016) across its 72.5 km2. Thus it was the fifth-largest by population and has the second-largest extent.
Ħ'Attard
Ħal Balzan
Ħad-Dingli
L-Iklin
Ħal Lija
L-Imdina
L-Imtarfa
Ir-Rabat (include the hamlets of Baħrija and Tal-Virtù) 
Is-Siġġiewi
Ħaż-Żebbuġ

Northern District 

The Northern District forms part of the Northern Region. It contains 6 local councils but no cities, with the largest locality being St. Paul's Bay ( 29,843); its smallest is Għargħur ( 2,743). The population of the District is 69,467 (as of 31 December 2016) across its 73.6 km2. It is the third most populous and is the largest.
Ħal Għargħur
Il-Mellieħa (include the parish area of Manikata) 
L-Imġarr
Il-Mosta
In-Naxxar (include the hamlet of Baħar iċ-Ċagħaq) 
San Pawl il-Baħar (include the hamlets of Buġibba, Burmarrad and Qawra)

Gozo and Comino District

The Gozo and Comino District is also the Gozo Region. It contains 14 local councils including the city of Victoria (or Rabat). This is also the largest locality ( 6,211) while the smallest one is Għasri (pop. 418). The population of the District is 31,879 (as of 31 December 2016) across its 68.7 km2. It is the least populous district and the third biggest.
Il-Fontana
Għajnsielem (including Comino)
L-Għarb
L-Għasri
Ta' Kerċem
Il-Munxar 
In-Nadur
Il-Qala
San Lawrenz
Ta' Sannat
Ix-Xagħra
Ix-Xewkija
Ir-Rabat (Victoria)
Iż-Żebbuġ

Electoral districts

There are currently 13 Electoral Divisions for the unicameral (single-assembly) parliament. Each consists of a number of localities (although there is no requirement that electoral boundaries follow the boundaries of localities).

District 1
Il-Belt Valletta 
Il-Furjana 
Il-Ħamrun
Il-Marsa
Tal-Pietà (including Gwardamanġa)
Santa Venera

District 2
Il-Birgu
L-Isla
Bormla
Ħaż-Żabbar (including St. Peter's)
Il-Kalkara
Ix-Xgħajra
Il-Fgura (Tal-Gallu area)

District 3
Iż-Żejtun
Ħal Għaxaq
Marsaskala
Marsaxlokk

District 4
Il-Fgura (Mater Boni Consigli and Tal-Liedna areas)
Il-Gudja
Paola
Santa Luċija
Ħal Tarxien

District 5
Birżebbuġa
Ħal Kirkop
L-Imqabba
Ħal Farruġ
Il-Qrendi
Ħal Safi
Iż-Żurrieq (including Bubaqra)

District 6
Ħal Luqa
Ħal Qormi
Is-Siġġiewi

District 7
Ħad-Dingli
L-Imġarr
L-Imtarfa
Ir-Rabat (including Il-Baħrija and Tal-Virtù)
Ħaż-Żebbuġ

District 8
Birkirkara (including Fleur-de-Lys and part of Swatar)
L-Iklin
Ħal Lija
Ħal Balzan

District 9
Ħal Għargħur
L-Imsida (including part of Swatar)
San Ġwann (including Il-Kappara)
Is-Swieqi (including Tal-Ibraġ and Il-Madliena)
Ta' Xbiex

District 10
Il-Gżira
Pembroke
San Ġiljan (including Paceville)
Tas-Sliema
In-Naxxar (San Pawl tat-Tarġa, Birguma, Magħtab and Salina areas)
Baħar iċ-Ċagħaq

District 11
Ħ'Attard
L-Imdina
Il-Mosta
Burmarrad

District 12
Il-Mellieħa (including Il-Manikata)
In-Naxxar (Church area)
San Pawl il-Baħar

District 13
This district consists of the islands of Gozo and Comino

Ir-Rabat (Victoria)
Il-Fontana 
Għajnsielem (including Comino)
L-Għarb
L-Għasri
Ta' Kerċem (including Santa Luċija)
Il-Munxar
Ix-Xlendi
In-Nadur
Il-Qala
San Lawrenz
Ta' Sannat
Ix-Xagħra
Ix-Xewkija
Iż-Żebbuġ (including Marsalforn)

Police districts
Following the 2022 amendments to the police district's boundaries and compositions, Malta has 2 police regions which fall under the responsibility of 2 distinct Assistant Commissioners. Each of these 2 regions consist of 6 police districts, amounting to a total of 12 districts. Each district is administered by its nominated Superintendent and has its own police headquarters.

Region A

District 1
Il-Belt Valletta, Archbishop Street
Il-Furjana, St. Anne Street
Pinto Police, Valletta Waterfront
Headquarters in Valletta, the capital city of Malta

District 2
Il-Ħamrun, St. Paul's Square
Santa Venera, St. Joseph High Road
Tal-Pietà and Gwardamanġa, St. Luke's Square
Il-Marsa, Balbi Street
Headquarters in Ħamrun

District 3
Paola, Valletta Road
Il-Fgura, Hompesch Road
Santa Luċija, Tower Promenade
Ħal Tarxien, Nelson Avenue
Ħal Luqa and Ħal Farruġ St. Andrew Square
Headquarters in Paola (Raħal Ġdid)

District 4
Bormla St. Paul's Street
Il-Birgu, Desain Street
L-Isla, 4 September Street
Il-Kalkara, Archbishop Gonzi Square
Ix-Xgħajra, Church Street
Ħaż-Żabbar and St. Peter's, Ċawsli Street
Marsaskala, Żonqor Road
Headquarters in Bormla (Città Cospicua)

District 5
Iż-Żejtun, Mater Boni Consiglii Street
Birżebbuġa, Pretty Bay
Marsaxlokk, Fishermen's Strand
Il-Gudja, Raymond Caruana Street 
Ħal Għaxaq, Labour Avenue
L-Imqabba, Parish Street
Ħal Kirkop, St. Benedict Street
Ħal Safi, St. Paul's Street
Headquarters in Iż-Żejtun (Città Beland)

District 6
Ħal Qormi Main Street
Ħaż-Żebbuġ Parish Street
Is-Siġġiewi St. Nicholas Square 
Għar Lapsi
Iż-Żurrieq and Bubaqra, St. Catherine Street 
Wied iż-Żurrieq
Il-Qrendi, Church Street
Headquarters in Qormi (Città Pinto)

Region B

District 7
Tas-Sliema, Rudolph Street
Il-Gżira, Belvedere Street
L-Imsida and Ta' Xbiex, Rue d'Argens
Headquarters in Tas-Sliema

District 8
San Ġiljan, Paceville, and Pembroke, St. George's Road, Spinola Bay 
Is-Swieqi and Il-Madliena, Keffa Street
San Ġwann and Il-Kappara, Naxxar Road
Headquarters in San Giljan

District 9
Birkirkara, Fleur-de-Lys and Is-Swatar, Main Street
Ħal Balzan, Ħal Lija and L-Iklin, Bertu Fenech Square (Balzan)
Ħ'Attard, Main Street
Ta' Qali, Pitkalija
In-Naxxar and Baħar iċ-Ċagħaq, Żenqa Street
Ħal Għargħur, St. Albert Street
Headquarters in Birkirkara, the second largest locality in Malta

District 10
Il-Mosta, Constitution Street
L-Imġarr, Fisher Street
Ir-Rabat, Il-Baħrija and Tal-Virtù, St. Rita Street
Ħad-Dingli, Main Street
L-Imdina, St. Publius Square
L-Imtarfa, Maltese Regiments Street
Headquarters in Il-Mosta, the third largest locality in Malta

District 11
San Pawl il-Baħar, Burmarrad and Ix-Xemxija, St. Paul's Street
Il-Qawra and Buġibba, Tourist Street
Il-Mellieħa, Parish Square
Iċ-Ċirkewwa, Ċirkewwa Terminal 
L-Għadira
Headquarters in San Pawl il-Bahar, the largest locality in Malta

District 12
Kemmuna, Congrave Street
Il-Fontana, Ta' Mulejja Street
Għajnsielem, Simirat Street
L-Għarb, Church Street
L-Għasri, Saviour Square
Ta' Kerċem and Santa Luċija, Sarġ Street
Marsalforn, Marina Street
Il-Port tal-Imġarr, Coast Road
Il-Munxar, Munxar Road
In-Nadur, Saints Peter and Paul Square
Il-Qala, St. Joseph Street
Ramla Bay
San Lawrenz, St. Lawrence Square
Ta' Sannat, Sannat Road
Ta' Pinu
Ix-Xagħra, 8 September Avenue 
Ix-Xewkija, Independence Street
Ix-Xlendi, St. Andrew Street
Iż-Żebbuġ, Church Street
Ir-Rabat, Għawdex (Victoria), Republic Street
Gozo Fire Brigade
Headquarters in Ir-Rabat, Għawdex (Victoria), the capital city of Gozo

References

 
Subdivisions of Malta
Districts